Lobogestoria is a genus of cylindrical bark beetles in the family Zopheridae. There is one described species in Lobogestoria, L. gibbicollis.

References

Further reading

 
 
 

Zopheridae
Articles created by Qbugbot